The BR-Radltour is an annual bicycle tour for recreational bicycle riders that was established in 1990. It is organized by the Bavarian Broadcasting Corporation (Bayerischer Rundfunk). The inventor of the BR-Radltour, Thomas Gaitanides retired in 2013 after his 23rd tour.

Normally the BR-Radltour has six leads through the Bavarian countryside. It is no competition but an event for people who prefer healthy sport and the community spirit with fellow cyclists.

The BR-Radltour is supposed to be the largest bicycling event in Germany. This is only accurate for the number of participants for the whole tour, which is mostly between 1,000 and 1,300. Bicycle tours that also allow one-day participants might have several thousand more.

Registration and participation 

The tour is announced in April on the internet pages of the Bavarian Broadcasting Corporation. Participation is only possible after an application and winning a vacancy in the following draw. Cyclists who sneak their way into the tour will be expelled. One-day participation was re-introduced in 2016.

The tour can handle some 1,000 to 1,300 cyclists. The number of participants depends on the number of available overnight quarters.

Start 

The BR-Radltour mostly starts on the first Saturday after the beginning of the summer holiday in Bavaria. This is in the last week of July or the first week of August. The tour ends on the following Saturday.

The tour

Sequence of events 
The first day of the tour is reserved for the check-in. The German railways provide several special trains for the cyclists.

The tour itself starts one day later. One lead has a length of 60 to 100 km (40 – 60 miles). There are one or two water breaks and a longer break for lunch. The tour has six or seven leads, so it will arrive at the tour destination on the following Friday. The next morning the cyclists return home, mostly on special trains.

Every evening an open-air concert with disco takes place on the local fairground, mostly with well-known international bands.

Service and support 
The cyclists stay overnight in sports halls on mattresses that were borrowed from the police or army.

The tour is supported by the "Allgemeiner Deutscher Fahrrad-Club" (ADFC), a German association of hobby cyclists. The ADFC provide a mobile workshop for fast bicycle repairs. The most important supporter is the "Technisches Hilfswerk" (THW) that transports the luggage and the mattresses for the overnight quarters and prepares the quarters (mostly gym halls). "Adelholzener Alpenquellen", a supplier of mineral water, sponsors the drinks for the cyclists.

BR-Radltour 2015 
The 26th BR-Radltour started on 2 August 2015 in Weilheim and ended in Mellrichstadt (Lower Franconia). It covered 483 kilometres (300 mi.)

BR-Radltour 2016 
The BR-Radltour 2016 started on 30 July 2016 in Marktredwitz and passed through Neustadt an der Waldnaab, Neunburg vorm Wald, Viechtach and Vilshofen. It ended on 5 August 2016 in Burghausen, Altötting. In 2016 there were only 1000 participants, and the tour covered only 430 km (267 mi.)

BR-Radltour 2017 
The BR-Radltour 2017 started on 29 July 2017 in Gunzenhausen. After a round-trip to Ellingen and back the tour passed through Nördlingen, Gersthofen, Landsberg and Memmingen. It ended on 4 August 2017 in Sonthofen. There were 1100 participants, and the tour covered 460 km (286 mi.)

BR-Radltour 2018 
The BR-Radltour 2018 started on 28 July 2018 in Mühldorf am Inn. The tour passed through Landshut, Bad Gögging, Berching, Baiersdorf and Kitzingen. It ended on 3 August 2018 in Marktheidenfeld after covering 480 km (298 mi.). The weather was dry and very hot, with only a short rainshower. 1100 participants joined the tour.

BR-Radltour 2019 
The BR-Radltour 2019 started on 27 July 2019 in Bad Staffelstein with 1100 participants. It began with a round tour to Seßlach and back before passing through Hollfeld, Lauf an der Pegnitz, Schwandorf, Deggendorf and ending in Bad Füssing. On the last day there was another round tour to Bad Birnbach and back. The Radltour was one day longer than usual because it was the 30th tour. It covered 567 km (352 miles) in total.

The two round tours were open for another 1100 participants.

BR-Radltour 2020/21 
The BR-Radltour 2020 was planned as a six-day tour from Cham to Lauf an der Pegnitz. It had to be cancelled due to the COVID-19 pandemic. The 2021 tour will not take place for the same reason.

See also 
 Cycle Oregon

Literature 
 Lutz Bäucker: BR-Radltour – Unsere Lieblingstouren: Mit Karten und Tipps, vielen Fotos und Anekdoten. Die schönsten Tourenbeschreibungen, Bilder und Geschichten aus 25 Jahren BR-Radltour. Bruckmann 2014,  (in German)

References

External links 
 Bavarian Broadcasting Corporation: BR-Radltour (in German)

Cycling in Germany
Bicycle tours